Gentle Monster styled as GENTLE MONSTER (Hangeul: 젠틀몬스터)  is a South Korean sunglasses and optical glasses brand founded by Hankook Kim in Seoul in 2011.
As of April 2018, the company has 41 directly operated stores worldwide, including in South Korea, China, Hong Kong, Singapore, the United Arab Emirates, the United Kingdom, and the United States.

Retail spaces
Gentle Monster employs 6 people to design its eyewear products and 60 people to design the store visuals. Its products are exhibited like museum pieces in "an immersive and experiential offline shopping experience."
For example, in May through August 2016 its New York City flagship store was turned into an underwater experience creates with aquarium designer Justin Muir and glass sculptor Ivan Lee Mora,  influenced by the French film Le Grand Bleu.

In February 2021, Gentle Monster opened a new space, Haus Dosan, to present the brand's direction in retail. Haus Dosan also carries  cosmetics brand Tamburins and has on-site  dessert cafe Nudake.

History
Serial entrepreneur Jae W Oh invested about $100,000 in 2012 and Gentle Monster began producing frames in Daegu, which had been a manufacturing hub for Luxottica,  and China, since acetate frames are illegal to produce in South Korea. The brand's designs favor oversize frames much larger than Western brands' because its Asian clientele prefer to have frames that create an image of a smaller face.

In 2013 and 2014, Korean actress Jun Ji-hyun wore Gentle Monster lenses on My Love From the Star, and this greatly broadened the brand's exposure to a mainstream audience.

In February 2016, the company's first US store opened on Grand Street in SoHo, New York City. Its second US store opened in downtown Los Angeles in October 2017. French luxury goods conglomerate LVMH invested $60 million for a 7% stake in the company in September 2017.

Marketing 
Tilda Swinton collaborated with Gentle Monster in February 2017 in designing three sunglasses and appeared in an ad campaign video. The brand shows at New York Fashion Week.

Collaborations
In 2016, the brand collaborated with Danish designer Henrik Vibskov, Hood by Air, and Opening Ceremony. In 2017, the brand collaborated with Dutch furniture designer Marcel Wanders, the founder of Moooi. In 2018, the brand collaborated on an exhibition called Burning Planet with South Korean rapper, Song Mino of Winner. In 2019, the brand collaborated with Chinese technology company Huawei and released smartglasses. In 2020, the brand collaborated with singer Jennie Kim of Blackpink to release the Jentle Home collection, and Chinese-Canadian singer and rapper Kris Wu for the release of the Gentle Wu collection. In 2022, the brand released a second collection with Kim, called the Jentle Garden collection. A mobile game was developed in promotion of the collaboration, while pop-up stores were opened in five cities: Seoul, Los Angeles, Hong Kong, Singapore, and Shanghai.

Clientele
The brand's celebrity customers include Beyonce, Rihanna, Gigi Hadid, Susan Sarandon, Tilda Swinton, Billie Eilish, and Jennie Kim.

See also

Ray-Ban
Persol
Warby Parker
Oliver Goldsmith
Korean wave

References

External links
 
@gentlemonster on Instagram

LVMH brands
Retail companies established in 2011
Retail companies of South Korea
Eyewear brands of South Korea
South Korean brands
Sunglasses
Design companies established in 2011
Manufacturing companies established in 2011
Companies based in Seoul
South Korean companies established in 2011